Pregame may refer to:

 Pre-game show, a television or radio presentation that occurs immediately before the live broadcast of a major sporting event
 Pregaming, the process of getting drunk prior to going out socializing